The Sun Magic 44 is a French sailboat that was designed by Daniel Andrieu as a cruiser-racer and first built in 1987. The design was also sold as the Sun Odyssey 44.

The design was licensed for production to Olympic Marine of Greece as the Atlantic 44 and first built in 1990.

Production
The design was built by Jeanneau in France, between 1987 and 1993, with about 700 boats completed, but it is now out of production.

Design
The Sun Magic 44 is a recreational keelboat, built predominantly of fiberglass, with wood trim. It has a masthead sloop rig, with a deck-stepped mast, two sets of unswept spreaders and aluminum spars with discontinuous stainless steel wire rigging. The hull has a raked stem, a reverse transom, an internally mounted spade-type rudder, with a partial skeg, controlled by a wheel and a fixed fin keel or optional stub keel and centerboard.

The fin keel model displaces  and carries  of iron ballast, while the centerboard version displaces  and carries  of ballast, consisting of exterior cast iron ballast and a steel centerboard.

The design has sleeping accommodation for eight people, with a double "V"-berth in the bow cabin, a second bunk forward port, a "U"-shaped settee in the main cabin and two aft cabins with double berths, plus a pilot berth on the starboard side. The galley is located amidships on the starboard side. The galley is "U"-shaped and is equipped with a two-burner stove, an ice box and a double sink. A navigation station is aft of the galley, on the starboard side. There are two heads, one just aft of the bow cabin on the starboard side and one on the port side aft.

See also
List of sailing boat types

References

External links

Keelboats
1980s sailboat type designs
Sailing yachts
Sailboat type designs by Daniel Andrieu
Sailboat types built by Jeanneau